The 2006 Illinois State Redbirds football team represented Illinois State University as a member of the Gateway Football Conference during the 2006 NCAA Division I FCS football season. Led by seventh-year head coach Denver Johnson, the Redbirds compiled an overall record of 9–4 with a mark of 5–2 in conference play, tying for second place in the Gateway. The team was ranked No 8 in The Sports Network's postseason NCAA Division I FCS rankings. Illinois State played home games at Hancock Stadium in Normal, Illinois.

Schedule

References

Illinois State
Illinois State Redbirds football seasons
Illinois State Redbirds football